Sparassus argelasius is a synonym of:

 Eusparassus dufouri, a huntsman spider found in the Western Mediterranean Basin
 Olios argelasius, a huntsman spider found in the Mediterranean Basin

Set index articles on spiders